Subra Suresh is an Indian-born American bioengineer, materials scientist, and academic. On 1 January 2018, he was inaugurated as the fourth President of Singapore's Nanyang Technological University (NTU), where he is also the inaugural Distinguished University Professor. Subra Suresh plans on stepping down from his role as the President of NTU at the end of 2022. He was the Vannevar Bush Professor of Engineering at the Massachusetts Institute of Technology (MIT), and Dean of the School of Engineering at MIT from 2007 to 2010 before being appointed as Director of the National Science Foundation (NSF) by Barack Obama, where he served from 2010 to 2013. He was the president of Carnegie Mellon University (CMU) from 2013 to 2017.

Suresh was elected to the US National Academy of Engineering in 2002, to the National Academy of Sciences in 2012 and to the Institute of Medicine (now the National Academy of Medicine) in 2013. He is one of a very small number of Americans to be elected to three branches of the U.S. National Academies, and the only current university president to hold this distinction. He was the first Asian-born professor to lead any of the five schools at MIT and the first Asian-born scientist to lead the NSF. He also served on the Engineering and Computer Science jury for the Infosys Prize in 2009 and 2010.

Early life and education 
Suresh was born in 1956 in Mumbai, India, and graduated from high school in Tamil Nadu at the age of 15. In May 1977, he received his BTech degree from the Indian Institute of Technology Madras in Chennai, graduating with a First Class with Distinction. Suresh received a Master's degree in Mechanical Engineering from Iowa State University in 1979, and a PhD in Mechanical Engineering from Massachusetts Institute of Technology under guidance of Robert O. Ritchie in 1981, specializing in materials science.

After postdoctoral research at the University of California, Berkeley, and the Lawrence Berkeley National Laboratory, he joined the faculty of engineering at Brown University in December 1983.

Career

Brown University 
Suresh joined Brown University in December 1983 as Assistant Professor of Engineering and was promoted to Associate Professor with tenure in July 1986 and to Professor in July 1989. In 1985, he was selected by the White House to receive the NSF Presidential Young Investigator Award. He also received the 1982 Hardy Medal "for exceptional promise for a successful career in the broad field of metallurgy by a metallurgist under the age of 30", and the 1992 Ross Coffin Purdy Award from the American Ceramic Society for the best paper published in the Journal of the American Ceramic Society in 1990.  In 1991, his book Fatigue of Materials was published by Cambridge University Press. According to Google Scholar it has been cited more than 5,300 times in scholarly publications, and has been translated into Chinese and Japanese and adopted as both a textbook and a reference work.

Massachusetts Institute of Technology 
Suresh moved to MIT in 1993 as the R.P. Simmons Professor of Materials Science and Engineering. He led MIT's Department of Materials Science and Engineering from 2000 to 2006.  He served as Massachusetts Institute of Technology's Dean of Engineering from 2007 to 2010 and held MIT faculty appointments in Materials Science and Engineering, Mechanical Engineering, Biological Engineering, and Health Sciences and Technology.

In his leadership roles at MIT, he helped create new state-of-the-art laboratories, a new undergraduate curriculum in materials science and engineering, the MIT Transportation Initiative, and the Center for Computational Engineering; led MIT's efforts in establishing the Singapore-MIT Alliance for Research and Technology (SMART) Center; and oversaw the recruitment of a record number of women faculty in engineering. As Dean of Engineering, he launched or oversaw a number of MIT's major international programs in Asia, the Middle East, Europe and the Americas.

National Science Foundation 
In June 2010, Suresh was nominated by U.S. President Barack Obama to be the Director of the National Science Foundation (NSF) and was unanimously confirmed by the US Senate in September 2010. The NSF is an independent federal agency with an annual (US)$7-billion budget. Its 2013 Fact Sheet stated that "[NSF's] programs and initiatives keep the United States at the forefront of science and engineering, empower future generations of scientists and engineers, and foster economic growth and innovation. NSF funds discovery, learning, innovation, and research infrastructure to boost U.S. leadership in all aspects of science, technology, engineering, and mathematics research and education.  In Fiscal Year 2012, NSF supported more than 300,000 individuals in 1,895 institutions in every state in the United States".

Suresh led NSF from 2010 to 2013. He established a number of new initiatives including Integrated NSF Support Promoting Interdisciplinary Research and Education (INSPIRE); Partnerships for Enhanced Engagement in Research (PEER), in collaboration with the United States Agency for International Development (USAID); Science Across Virtual Institutes (SAVI); the NSF Career-Life Balance Initiative; Graduate Research Opportunities Worldwide (GROW); and the NSF Innovation Corps (I-Corps).

During this time Suresh served as a member of the National Science and Technology Council (NSTC), a cabinet-level council comprising federal agency heads and cabinet secretaries. He co-chaired the NSTC Committee on Science and the Committee on Science, Technology, Engineering and Mathematics (STEM) Education, and served as a member of the cabinet-level National Ocean Council.  Suresh also chaired the Interagency Arctic Research Policy Committee (IARPC), which helped set priorities for coordinating future arctic research across the federal government. Under Suresh's leadership, IARPC released a multiagency five-year strategic plan.

In response to an invitation from the White House Office of Science and Technology Policy, Suresh established and chaired a Global Summit on Scientific Merit Review at NSF in May 2012. This Summit included the participation, for the first time, of the heads of leading science funding agencies from nearly 50 countries. Summit participants endorsed a Statement of Principles of Scientific Merit Review to serve as a basis for potential multilateral collaborations in the future, and launched a virtual entity, the Global Research Council (GRC), to co-ordinate practices and enhance international scientific collaboration between developed and developing countries. In an editorial in Science magazine, Suresh stated, "Good science anywhere is good for science everywhere".

Commenting on Suresh's departure from NSF, President Obama stated, "We have been very fortunate to have Subra Suresh guiding the National Science Foundation for the last two years. He has shown himself to be a consummate scientist and engineer – beholden to evidence and committed to upholding the highest scientific standards.  He has also done his part to make sure the American people benefit from advances in technology, and opened up more opportunities for women, minorities, and other underrepresented groups. I am grateful for his service."

Carnegie Mellon University 
Suresh was appointed as the 9th president of Carnegie Mellon University in 2013 and served as president until 2017. During this time he also held faculty appointments in CMU's Departments of Materials Science and Engineering, Biomedical Engineering, Engineering and Public Policy, School of Computer Science, and in the Heinz College. In 2017, his total compensation was $1.1 million, making him the second highest paid private college president in Pennsylvania.

As President, Suresh worked to increase the numbers of women recruited to science, technology and mathematics disciplines. He was quoted as saying “If the United States is to remain a leader in discovery and innovation, we must engage the enormous talent pool represented by our young women.”

During Suresh's tenure, CMU settled a major patent infringement lawsuit against Marvell Technology Group. Suresh announced that the majority of the funds received by the university, expected to be about $250 million, would be dedicated to programs that "enhance the student experience". Suresh also negotiated several major donations from philanthropists and corporations, including $67M from CMU alum David Tepper to enhance collaboration among CMU's schools and colleges, $35M from Tata Consultancy Services and $5.5M from Uber.

In early 2017 Suresh pledged support to CMU's students following President Trump's immigration ban. In a letter circulated to students, Subra Suresh commented that he was "deeply troubled by some of the news out of Washington in recent days, and potential threats – explicit and implicit – posed to the work of so many students and scholars across the nation who were not born in the United States." Suresh recounted his own journey as an immigrant to the United States writing, "I first came to the US at age 21 with a partially filled suitcase, less than $100 in cash, and a one-way airplane ticket purchased with a loan. Once in the US, I was able to pursue a series of extraordinary opportunities for scholarship and service without regard for my national origin — an experience that forged in me an unshakeable faith in the ability of this nation to help everyone to succeed, wherever they came from." 
		
Suresh has consistently advocated for diversity in higher education. In 2014 he commented to the Pittsburgh Gazette that "Diversity in the broadest sense — intellectual, cultural, ethnic, racial or national origin — intrinsically enhances artistic and technical innovation".

He resigned from presidency on 30 July 2017 after completing four years of his five-year term. He gave no reason as to why he was stepping down from the post.

Nanyang Technological University Singapore 
Suresh was inaugurated as President of NTU Singapore in January 2018. He quickly launched an initiative to turn the NTU campus into a "smart" campus, with eco-friendly buildings, greater use of robotics, and driverless electric buses. He has overseen the establishment of the Alibaba-NTU Joint Research Institute on artificial intelligence, a collaboration with Volvo on driverless buses, a second artificial intelligence collaboration with SenseTime, and a collaboration with Surbana Jurong focused on urban challenges.

On 27 August 2018, Suresh announced a 5-year plan with a number of major initiatives:

 Creation of a new university-wide postdoctoral fellowship program to attract up to 350 of the best young scholars world-wide to NTU;
 Recruitment of up to 300 faculty members;
 Introduction of 300 new four-year Ph.D. fellowships;
 Introduction of 100 new named professorships;
 Construction of a 40,000 gross sq. m (400,000 gross sq. ft.) academic building by 2021, which will be the largest wooden building in Asia;
 Doubling of the energy harvested from the sun, to up to 10MW, to power up to 10% of the electricity needs of the NTU campus by 2019;
 A reduction in campus-wide energy consumption by 35% and 50% by 2021 and 2025, respectively, compared to 2011;
 Streamlining of academic and administrative services to improve operational efficiency; and
 A new S$10M fund (Accelerating Creativity and Excellence) for multidisciplinary research.

On 6 June 2022, Suresh announced he will step down as NTU President by end-December to spend more time with his family in US.

Research 
Suresh's research is focused in three areas: modeling and engineering the mechanical properties of structural and functional materials, the mechanical properties of biological cells and molecules, and the implications of these properties for human disease.  His work crosses traditional disciplinary boundaries in engineering, physical sciences, life sciences, and medicine.  More than 100 students, postdoctoral fellows, and visiting scholars have been members of his research group, and many now occupy prominent positions in academia, industry, and government worldwide.

Publications, Patents 
Suresh is the author or co-author of more than 300 research articles in international journals, co-editor of five books, and co-inventor on 26 U.S. and international patent applications. He has authored or co-authored three books: Fatigue of Materials, Fundamentals of Functionally Graded Materials, and Thin Film Materials.

Suresh's research contributions at the intersections of engineering, physical sciences, life sciences, and medicine include:

 Identification of key mechanisms that influence the growth of fatigue cracks in a wide variety of brittle and ductile materials;
 Development of experimental and computational methods for optimising the mechanical performance of composites and compositionally graded materials;
 Formulation of new experimental methods and algorithms to link the mechanical characteristics of thin films, coatings, and multi-layered materials with performance;
 Study of nano-crystallisation during room-temperature mechanical contact in metallic glasses;
 Development of strategies to optimise strength, ductility, and damage tolerance of materials through the controlled introduction of nano-scale internal interfaces;
 Delineation of links between the mechanics of individual blood cells and human disease states;
 Elucidation of the role of RESA [ring-infected erythrocyte surface antigen] protein in modulating the mechanical properties and rheological response of human blood cells invaded by malaria parasites; and
 Development of new microfluidic platforms for human disease diagnostics, therapeutics, and drug efficacy essays.

Honors 
In 2007 he became a member of the German Academy of Sciences Leopoldina.

In 2013, Suresh was elected to the Institute of Medicine. He is also a member of the National Academy of Sciences and the National Academy of Engineering

In 2011, Suresh received the Padma Shri award, India's fourth-highest civilian honour, bestowed by the President of India. Other honors include the 2006 Acta Materialia Gold Medal; the 2007 European Materials Medal, the highest honour conferred by the Federation of European Materials Societies; the 2008 A. Cemal Eringen Medal from the Society of Engineering Science; the 2011 General President's Gold Medal from the Indian National Science Congress; the 2012 R.F. Mehl Award from the Minerals, Metals & Materials Society; the 2011 Nadai Medal from the American Society of Mechanical Engineers (ASME); and the 2011 National Materials Advancement Award from the Federation of Materials Societies. In 2011, Science Watch/Thomson Reuters selected Suresh as one of the top 100 materials scientists worldwide for the decade 2000–2010. He also received ASME's 2012 Timoshenko Medal, the highest recognition in the field of theoretical and applied mechanics, and the 2013 Alan Cottrell Gold Medal for his pioneering work on fracture and fatigue of materials. He received the Franklin Institute's 2013 Benjamin Franklin Medal in Mechanical Engineering and Materials Science for "outstanding contributions to our understanding of the mechanical behaviour of materials in applications ranging from large structures down to the atomic level." and for showing "how deformation of biological cells can be linked to human disease". In 2015, Suresh was awarded the IRI Medal by the Industrial Research Institute. Suresh received the ASME Medal in 2020.

Suresh is a member of the Royal Academy of Engineering of Spain; the Spanish Royal Academy of Sciences; the German Academy of Sciences; the Royal Swedish Academy of Engineering Sciences; the Academy of Sciences for the Developing World; the Indian National Academy of Engineering; the Indian Academy of Sciences; the Chinese Academy of Sciences; and the French Academy of Sciences. He is a recipient of 15 honorary doctorate degrees from universities in the United States, Sweden, Spain, Switzerland, India, China, and the United Kingdom.

Suresh has been elected a fellow or honorary fellow of many materials societies in the United States and India, including the Materials Research Society; ASM International; the Minerals, Metals & Materials Society; the American Society of Mechanical Engineers; the American Ceramic Society; the Indian Institute of Metals; and the Materials Research Society of India.

He served as an independent director of Battelle Memorial Institute from 2014 to 2017, and of the Lord Corporation in 2010. He has been a member of the Board of Directors of Hewlett-Packard since 2015. Recently, he was nominated by the Singapore Exchange (SGX) to be an independent director of the SGX Board.

References

External links

Biography at Carnegie Mellon University
Biography at NTU Singapore

1956 births
Living people
American academics of Indian descent
American people of Indian Tamil descent
Foreign Fellows of the Indian National Science Academy
Foreign members of the Chinese Academy of Sciences
IIT Madras alumni
Iowa State University alumni
MIT School of Engineering alumni
MIT School of Engineering faculty
Members of the United States National Academy of Engineering
Academic staff of Nanyang Technological University
Presidents of Nanyang Technological University
Presidents of Carnegie Mellon University
Recipients of the Padma Shri in science & engineering
United States National Science Foundation officials
Indian expatriate academics
American expatriate academics
Indian expatriates in Singapore
American expatriates in Singapore
Obama administration personnel
Brown University faculty
Members of the German Academy of Sciences Leopoldina
Fellows of the Minerals, Metals & Materials Society
ASME Medal recipients